Hype! (1996) is a documentary directed by Doug Pray about the popularity of grunge rock in the early to mid-1990s United States.  It incorporates interviews and rare concert footage to trace the development of the grunge scene from its early beginning in neighborhood basements to its emergence as an explosive pop culture phenomenon.  Hype! attempts to dispel some of the myths of the genre promulgated by media hype by depicting the grunge subculture from the point of view of people who were active in the scene. The film generally portrays this mythos in a satirical way while acknowledging that it was media hype that helped propel some of these obscure bands to fame.

Release
The film premiered at the Sundance Film Festival in January 1996. It opened to general audiences on November 8 of the same year.

Reception
The film holds a 93% rating on Rotten Tomatoes based on 27 reviews with an average rating of 7.5/10.

Appearances
Hype! includes interviews and performances from bands (primarily oriented with the Sub Pop Records axis) such as TAD, Blood Circus, Mudhoney, Nirvana, Soundgarden, Coffin Break, The Gits, Love Battery, Flop, The Melvins, Some Velvet Sidewalk, Mono Men, Supersuckers, Zipgun, Seaweed, Pearl Jam, 7 Year Bitch, Hovercraft, Gas Huffer, and Fastbacks. It also features interviews with band manager Susan Silver, record producers Jack Endino and Steve Fisk, and photographer Charles Peterson.

Along with the DVD that comes with Nirvana's With the Lights Out, it is one of the few films to contain video footage of Nirvana's first performance of their breakthrough hit, "Smells Like Teen Spirit".

In the film, Seattle producer/engineer Jack Endino is humorously referred to as "the godfather of grunge."

Soundtrack

Sub Pop released a soundtrack to the film in 1996 on CD and a limited box set on colored 7" vinyl.  [ AMG entry]

Charts

Award 
 Seattle International Film Festival 1996 : Best Documentary

See also
1991: The Year Punk Broke
Grunge speak
Hype! The Motion Picture Soundtrack

References

External links

 

Doug Pray Interview

1996 films
Grunge
Rockumentaries
Films directed by Doug Pray
Documentary films about Seattle
1990s English-language films